Arend van 't Hoft (born 31 August 1933) is a Dutch racing cyclist. He competed in the individual and team road race events at the 1952 Summer Olympics.

See also
 List of Dutch Olympic cyclists

References

1933 births
Living people
Dutch male cyclists
Olympic cyclists of the Netherlands
Cyclists at the 1952 Summer Olympics
People from Haarlemmermeer
Cyclists from North Holland
20th-century Dutch people